The 2021–22 Swadhinata KS season was the 1st competitive highest level season. This season will remarks 17th existence season overall in Bangladesh football. The season were covered from 1 October 2021–2 August 2022.

Season summary

November
On 29 November Swadhinata KS has played their inaugural Independence Cup match against Dhaka Abahani and they have defeated by 2-1 goals. Only goal by Uzbekistan midfielder Nodir Mavlonov wasn't not enough to save the match.

December
On 3 December Swadhinata KS defeated Rahmatganj MFS by 3–2 goals. Early goal on 3 minutes by Philip Adjah give lead Rahmatganj MFS but in the 16 minutes score level by Rafał Zaborowski. In 25 minutes goal by Sanowar Hossain Rahmatganj MFS finished first half with score 2–1. In the second half scored level by Swadhinata KS Nedo Turković on 50 minutes. On 80 minutes second goal by Rafał Zaborowski gave lead 3–2 and Swadhinata KS ensured win.

On 10 December Swadhinata KS defeated against Saif Sporting Club by 0–2. First and second half both teams were goalless. In the 91 minutes goal by Saif Sporting Club Maraz Hossain and second goals on 99 minutes by Foysal Ahmed Fahim ensure their victory and Swadhinata KS eliminated from the tournament.

On 25 December 2021 Swadhinata KS won by 3–0 Walkover laws. The match were scheduled to play against Bashundhara Kings but Kings withdrew their name from the tournament.

On 27 December Swadhinata KS draw 1–1 goals against Dhaka Mohammedan. On 39 minutes Souleymane Diabate gave the lead Dhaka Mohammedan but after 1 minute Nedo Turković goal level score  and finished first half. In the second half both team played goalless. Meanwhile, both team fair play point was same due to withdrawn Bashundhara Kings. Referee and match commissioner decided to determined group champion used penalty shoot out. Dhaka Mohammdan won by 4–3 goals.

January
On 2 December Swadhinata KS lost 2–0 goals against Saif Sporting Club. First half in 40 minutes goal by Rahim Uddin Saif Sporting Club hold a lead before half time. In the second half 71 minutes Maraz Hossain goal made score 2–0. Swadhinata KS didn't able to defend their lost and they have eliminated from the tournament.

February
On 3 February Swadhinata KS has played their away  game versus Bashundhara Kings and won by 2–1 goals. On 25 minutes Nedo Turković penalty goal took lead and on 45+1 minutes goal by Rasel Ahmed made the score Swadhinata KS 2–0 before go to half time. In the second half time goal on 73 minutes by Bashundhara Kings Tawhidul Alam Sabuz made score 2–1 but Bashundhara Kings players couldn't found the net to score any goals to avoid the loss of the match.

On 10 February Dhaka Mohammedan defeated Swadhinata KS by 1–0 goal in the away match. In the first half both team are played excellent and competitive football at the end of first time scoreline were 0–0 goal. In the second half both team started attacking football to take lead and Dhaka Mohammedan got it by Souleymane Diabate on 77 minutes and made it 1–0 scoreline. In the 84 minutes Murad Hasan Swadhinata KS showed red card and sentoff him until end the match Swadhinata KS tried with their ten men's squad to find goal but they won't able avoid loss the game.

On 14 February Swadhinata KS drew 0–0 goal against Uttar Baridhara Club in the away game. In the first halftime both teams played excellent and competitive football and first halftime finished 0–0 goal. In the second halftime also both teams players hasn't found net and finished the game 0–0. They left the ground with 1 point.

On 19 February Swadhinata  KS lost by 1–2 against Chittagong Abahani at home game. In the first halftime on 24 minutes goal by Peter Ebimobowei took lead Chittagong Abahani and finished halftime with 1–0 lead. In the second  halftime on 71 minutes Omid Popalzay goal  made scoreline 2–0 but after 8 minutes Mohammed Jahedul Alam reduced goals different for Swadhinata KS 1–2 goals.

On 25 February Swadhinata KS lost by 1–2 goals against Muktijoddha Sangsad KC in the away match. In the first half both teams played goalless. In the second half on 54 minutes Nedo Turković score gave lead Swadhinata KS but on 81 minutes Muktijoddha Sangsad KC equalized score 1–1 by own goal of Hasan Murad Swadhinata KS. After 2 minutes Japanese Tetsuaki Misawa goal made score 2–1 Muktijoddha Sangsad KC and Muktijoddha Sangsad KC graved the first victory of Premier League football.

March
On 1 March Swadhinta KS defeated by 1–5 goals to Saif Sporting Club at home game.

On 7 March Swadhinata KS defeated to Bangladesh Police FC by 2–4 goals at in the away match.

On 11 March Swadhinata KS drew against Dhaka Abahani by 1–1 at home ground.

On 16 March Swadhinata KS drew by 1–1 goals against Rahmatganj MFS in the away match. In the first half both teams played excellent and competitive football and at the end of the first half scoreline was 0–0. In the second half on 56 minutes Ghanaian forward Philip Adjah goal took lead Rahmatganj MFS but the club was not able to defend score for a long Swadhinata KS forward Zilliur Rahman goal on 64 minutes equalized score 1–1 goals. Rest of the time were not score any goals and both are share points.

April
On 3 April Swadhinata KS lost against Sheikh Jamal DC by 1–3 goals at home ground. In the first half on 29 and 38 minutes Gambian Matthew Chinedu goal Sheikh Jamal DC took lead and finished first half 0–2. In the second half on 53 minutes Nedo Turković goal made score 1–2. But Swadhinata KS couldn't able to avoid their defeat Matthew Chinedu hat trick goals on 67 minutes secured huge victory for Sheikh Jamal DC.

On 9 April Swadhinata KS lost to Sheikh Russel KC by 2–1 goals in the away game. On 13 Minutes defender Manik Hossain Molla and on 20 minutes penalty goal by Tajikistan defender Aizar Akmatov goal took lead by 2–0 score and finished first halftime. In the second halftime before referee added extra both teams were not found net but on 90+3 minutes a goal by Uzbekistan defender Nodir Mavlonov Swadhinata KS reduced score to 2–1.

On 24 April Swadhinata KS lost against Bashundhara Kings by 0–2 goals at home game. In the first half debutant Brazilian forward Miguel Figueira two goals on 28 and 35 minutes got lead Bashundhara Kings and finished half time. In the last 45 minutes both teams play defensive football and Bashundhara Kings took their very first game revenge against Swadhinata KS.

May
On 8 May Swadhinata KS  have lost versus  Uttar Baridhara Club by 0–2 goals at home game.

On 13 May Swadhinata KS have defeated by 2–3 goals against Chittagong Abahani in the away game.

June
On 23 June Swadhinata KS lost against Muktijoddha Sangsad KC by 0–1 goal at home game.

On 28 June Swadhinata KS have won versus Saif Sporting Club with score 2–1 in the away game.

July

On 4 July Swadhinata KS have lost by 0–1 goal versus Bangladesh Police FC in the ground.

On 14 July Swadhinata KS have defeated to Dhaka Abahani by 1–4 goals in the away match.

On 21 July Swadhinata KS have lost by 1–5 goals against Rahmatganj MFS at home game.

On 26 July Swadhinata KS have drew against Sheikh Jamal DC by 2–2 goals in the away game.

August
On 2 August Swadhinata KS have lost to Sheikh Russel KC with score 1–4 goals at home match.

Current squad
Swadhinata KS squad for 2021–22 season.

Pre-season friendly

Transfer

In

Competitions

Overall

Overview

Independence Cup

Group stages

Group A

Knockout stage

Federation Cup

Group stages

Group A

Knockout stage

Premier League

League table

Results summary

Results by round

Matches

Statistics

Goalscorers

Source: Matches

References

Football clubs in Bangladesh
2005 establishments in Bangladesh
Bangladeshi football club records and statistics
Sport in Dhaka
2021 in Bangladeshi football
2022 in Bangladeshi football